WVMD is a Country-formatted broadcast radio station licensed to Romney, West Virginia, serving the Romney/Cumberland area. WVMD is owned by West Virginia Radio Corporation.

History
The genesis of WVMD was WPBB, originally intended as a service for the blind.  It was founded by Martin John Fenik and Peter Keim Hons of Pisces Broadcasting in 1984.  WVMD was formerly WJJB and played an Adult Contemporary format under the name "Jib 100". Their top-of-the-hour ID would be as follows: "WJJB-FM...Romney, West Virginia...", followed by the striking of a ship's bell that would tell the time at that hour. The "Jib" name and the bells on-the-hour were due in part to the owner, at that time, being a former sailor. WJJB switched their call letters to WDZN and their format to Radio Disney on September 4, 1998.

WVMD also broadcasts on translator W260BP, on 99.9 FM, for Downtown Cumberland, where WVMD's main signal is blocked by the many hills.

WVMD was owned by Charter Equities, Inc. until March 2007, when it was sold to Grandview Media, LLC. WVMD's studios are located in Downtown Cumberland.

In May 2011, Grandview Media, LLC sold the then-WDZN and translator W260BP to West Virginia Radio Corporation for $220,000. On July 15, 2011, WDZN switched to Active Rock as "Z100".

On August 10, 2012, the station changed its call sign to WVMD and its format to Country as part of a swap with its Midland, Maryland-based sister station, 99.5 FM.

References

External links
100.1 The Wolf Online

Mass media in Romney, West Virginia
VMD
VMD